Ralph Yirikian (born November 16, 1967) is an Armenian businessman who was the former CEO of VivaCell-MTS  (MTS Armenia CJSC), a 2005 startup company which became Armenia's leading telecommunications operator and one of the top taxpayers. As reported, he left the company in 2022 to concentrate in his own business. The factual reasons behind this move is not reported.CEO of Ucom Armenia  (Ucom ArmeniaCJSC), a 2023 startup company which became Armenia's leading telecommunications operator

Early life and education
Ralph Yirikian was born on November 16, 1967, in Beirut, Lebanon. With his younger twin brothers and sister, he grew up in Beirut. After civil war broke out in 1975, his childhood was marked by deprivation and scenes of violence.

Yirikian graduated from the American University of Beirut with a bachelor's degree in economics in 1991. In 1992, he received a second bachelor's degree from the university, this time in business administration.

Business career
From 1991 to 1992, Yirikian worked at AUB's Jafet Library as an assistant in the Archiving and Documentation Department, and later as a computer operator at the Lebanese George Matta Establishment. In 1993, he worked as an executive secretary of Al Maha Group Holdings in Qatar, and as an assistant management consultant at Nasser, Ghattas and Co, in Cyprus. 
 
From 1994 to 1996, Yirikian was the Head of the Administration and Personnel Department at Al Maha Group Holdings. From 1997 to 1999, he was the head of the Administration and Customer Service Department at Nasser, Ghattas and Co. Between 1999 and 2001, Yirikian was the head of the Administrative Unit at the Lebanese telecommunications company LibanCell. From February 2002 till July 2004, he was the General Manager of Karabakh Telecom.

General Manager at VivaCell-MTS
Ralph Yirikian was the VivaCell-MTS General Manager, from November 2004 to June 2022. Under his leadership, in a short period of time VivaCell-MTS grew into an exemplary enterprise with over 60% of market share, about 1300 employees and one of the largest taxpayers of Armenia.

VivaCell grew quickly and in 2007, the company's only shareholder, Fattouch Group, agreed to sell 80% of its shares to Mobile TeleSystems PJSC (MTS), the largest mobile operator in the Commonwealth of Independent States and the Russian Federation. As of today, VivaCell-MTS (MTS Armenia CJSC) shareholders are 80% MTS Group (Mobile TeleSystems PJSC) and 20% - Lebanese Fattouche Group. Yirikian stayed as the General Manager of VivaCell-MTS after the acquisition by MTS. Under his leadership, the company continued striving and achieved new heights, such as being the first to roll out 3G based on UMTS/HSPA (Universal Mobile Telecommunications System / High Speed Packet Access) technology in Armenia, launched on April 17, 2009, which was a defining moment for the Armenian population. The introduction of 3G opened up new opportunities for the business and everyday life in the country. Further, on December 20, 2010, VivaCell-MTS launched the first 4G/LTE network in Armenia.

VivaCell-MTS' LTE roll-out positioned Armenia to be one of the selected global leaders in 4G deployment. In addition, the launch of 4G is expected to present Armenia as "a country with attractive communication infrastructure”, commented Yirikian. Now, VivaCell-MTS’ 4G/LTE network, which is the largest in Armenia, covers 22 towns and is available to 52.5% of the population.

New culture of management
In the early days of VivaCell-MTS’ operation, Yirikian not only had to overcome the technical challenges of building a radio network, installing base stations in remote areas throughout the mountainous country, recruiting specialists, but he also had to battle with the remnants of Armenian business culture from the Soviet era. Yirikian explains that he urged his employees to take responsibility and make their own decisions.

The new culture of corporate management developed at VivaCell-MTS in the course of its activity gave birth to a lecture course called “Business with a Mission”, where the experience of more than 11 years of successful operation was summarized. At the beginning, the lecture was being delivered to university students who were hosted at VivaCell-MTS under the umbrella of Open Days at VivaCell-MTS frequently organized by the company. Ralph Yirikian has been personally lecturing for senior school children and university students, by giving them an opportunity to physically get acquainted with how the company operates, interacts with its customers and lives as a family.

Later on, as a visiting lecturer, Ralph Yirikian was invited to numerous higher educational institutions to speak on the “Business with a Mission.” Also, based on the request by higher educational institutions, he delivers lectures on the basics of telecommunications and corporate culture

Family
Ralph Yirikian is married and has one daughter and one son.

Filmography

References

1967 births
20th-century businesspeople
21st-century businesspeople
American University of Beirut alumni
Armenian businesspeople
Businesspeople from Beirut
Lebanese people of Armenian descent
Living people